Adventure Story is a British television play, based on the stage play by Terence Rattigan, and tells the story of Alexander the Great and his conquest of Persia. It featured Sean Connery in his first starring role and was praised at the time for its acting.

Cast

 Sean Connery - Alexander the Great
 William Russell - Hephaestion
 Lyndon Brook - Philotas
 William Devlin - Parmenion, Philotas' Father
 Alex Scott - Ptolemy
 Edward Cast - Perdiccas
 Michael Brennan - Father Cleitus
 Noel Hood - The Pythia, Priestess of Apollo
 Walter Brown - Polystratos
 Paul Stassino - King Darius
 Margaretta Scott - Queen Mother
 Ann Dimitri - Queen Stateira
 Pauline Knight - Princess Stateira
 Alan Tilvern - Prince Bessus, Satrap of Bactria
 Bandana Das Gupta - Roxana
 Tutte Lemkow - Mazeres, The King's Chamberlain
 Walter Randall - Palace Official
 Simon Levy - Persian Officer

Critical reception
A contemporary critic in The Times wrote of Connery's performance, "certain inflexions and swift deliberations of gesture at times made one feel that the part had found the young Olivier it needs," and wrote that Rudolph Cartier's production, "had the freedom of spaciousness to which this producer has accustomed us, and all the acting was on a big scale, to match Mr Clifford Hatch's settings." and more recently, reviewing it on DVD, Screenplaystv wrote, "the first half and more of the drama plays like a slightly ludicrous historical pageant, and only towards the end does it begin to explore something more ambitious and ambivalent...Sean Connery is most definitely the reason to watch it now,...there is a lavish quality to the staging (which even stretches to three real horses at one point), and the sumptuous costumes are shown to advantage in the fine print on the DVD."

References

External links

1961 in British television
English-language television shows
British adventure television series
British historical television series
Films directed by Rudolph Cartier
Cultural depictions of Alexander the Great
Television series set in ancient Greece